

Ulmus subgenera and sectional classification
Classification of Ulmus is based primarily on Whittemore et al 2021. Previous Ulmus classifications include Wiegrefe et al 1994, and Melville & Heybroek 1971. 

Subgenus Indoptelea
Ulmus villosa - marn or cherry bark elm
Subgenus Oreoptelea
U. section Blepharocarpus
Ulmus americana - American elm, white elm
Ulmus laevis - European white elm, fluttering elm, spreading elm, (US) Russian elm
Ulmus laevis var. celtidea
Ulmus laevis var. laevis
Ulmus laevis var. parvifolia
Ulmus laevis var. simplicidens 
U. section Chaetoptelea
Ulmus alata - winged elm, Wahoo
Ulmus crassifolia - cedar elm
Ulmus elongata - long raceme elm
Ulmus ismaelis
Ulmus mexicana - Mexican elm
Ulmus serotina - September elm
Ulmus thomasii - rock elm, cork elm
Subgenus Ulmus
U. section Foliaceae
Ulmus castaneifolia - chestnut-leafed elm, multi-nerved elm
Ulmus changii - Hangzhou elm
Ulmus changii var. changii
Ulmus changii var. kunmingensis
Ulmus chenmoui - Chenmou elm, Langya Mountain elm
Ulmus chumlia 
Ulmus davidiana  - David Elm, Father David's elm
Ulmus davidiana var. davidiana
Ulmus davidiana var. japonica - Japanese elm, Wilson's elm
Ulmus harbinensis - Harbin elm
Ulmus microcarpa - Tibetan elm
Ulmus minor - field elm
Ulmus minor subsp. canescens - grey elm, grey-leafed elm, hoary elm 
Ulmus minor var. italica - Mediterranean elm
Ulmus prunifolia - cherry-leafed elm
Ulmus pumila - Siberian elm
Ulmus szechuanica - Szechuan elm
U. section Microptelea
Ulmus lanceifolia - Vietnam elm
Ulmus parvifolia - Chinese elm, lacebark elm
Ulmus parvifolia var. coreana - Korean lacebark elm 
Ulmus parvifolia var. parvifolia
U. section Trichocarpus
Ulmus glaucescens - Gansu elm 
Ulmus glaucescens var. glaucescens
Ulmus glaucescens var. lasiocarpa
Ulmus lamellosa - Hebei elm
Ulmus macrocarpa - large-fruited elm 
Ulmus macrocarpa var. glabra
Ulmus macrocarpa var. macrocarpa
U. section Ulmus
Ulmus bergmanniana - Bergmann's elm
Ulmus bergmanniana var. bergmanniana
Ulmus bergmanniana var. lasiophylla
Ulmus glabra - wych elm, Scots elm
Ulmus laciniata - Manchurian elm, cut-leaf elm
Ulmus laciniata var. laciniata
Ulmus laciniata var. nikkoensis - Nikko elm
Ulmus rubra - slippery elm, red elm
Ulmus uyematsui - Alishan elm
Ulmus wallichiana - Himalayan elm, Kashmir elm
Ulmus wallichiana subsp. xanthoderma
Ulmus wallichiana subsp. wallichiana
Section Incertae sedis
Ulmus gaussenii - Anhui elm
Ulmus pseudopropinqua - Harbin spring elm

Extinct Elms
Fossil elms 
Ulmus affinis  (syn= Ulmus californica )
Ulmus braunii 
Ulmus brownellii 
Ulmus carpinoides 
Ulmus chaneyi 
Ulmus chuchuanus 
Ulmus fushunensis 
Ulmus minima 
Ulmus minoensis 
Ulmus miopumila 
Ulmus moorei 
Ulmus moragensis  
Ulmus newberryi 
Ulmus okanaganensis  (subgenus Ulmus)
Ulmus owyheensis 
Ulmus paucidentata 
Ulmus protojaponica 
Ulmus pseudo-americana 
Ulmus pseudolongifolia 
Ulmus pyramidalis 
Ulmus pseudopyramidalis 
Ulmus rhamnifolia 
Ulmus speciosa  (syn= Ulmus tanneri  )
Ulmus stuchlikii 
Ulmus subparvifolia 
Ulmus tenuiservis  (syn= Ulmus montanensis )

Ulmus eolaciniata was moved from Ulmus to the new combination Rubus eolaciniata by Tanai and Wolfe in 1977.

See also
 List of elm cultivars, hybrids and hybrid cultivars

References

Further reading

Bean, W. J. (1981). Trees and shrubs hardy in Great Britain, 7th edition. Murray, London. 
Brasier, C. M. (1996). New horizons in Dutch elm disease control. Pages 20–28 in: Report on Forest Research, 1996. Forestry Commission. HMSO, London, UK.

Collin, E. (2001). Elm. In Teissier du Cros (Ed.) (2001) Forest Genetic Resources Management and Conservation. France as a case study. Ministry of Agriculture and Fisheries, Bureau of Genetic Resources. INRA DIC. France.
Elwes, H. J. & Henry, A. (1913). The Trees of Great Britain & Ireland. Vol. VII. pp 1848–1929. Private publication 
Fu, L., Xin, Y. & Whittemore, A. (2002). Ulmaceae, in Wu, Z. & Raven, P. (eds), (2003). Flora of China, Vol. 5 (Ulmaceae through Basellaceae). Science Press, Beijing, and Missouri Botanical Garden Press, St. Louis, USA. 
Melville, R. & Heybroek, H. (1971). Elms of the Himalaya. Kew Bulletin, Vol. 26 (1). Kew, London.
Richens, R. H. (1983). Elm. Cambridge University Press.
Ware, G. (1995). Little-known elms from China: landscape tree possibilities. Journal of Arboriculture, (Nov. 1995). International Society of Arboriculture, Champaign, Illinois, US. .

Ulmus
elm